Muman, also rendered as Moman, may refer to:
 Muman-e Bala
 Muman-e Pain
 Muman-e Vasat